Nicklin may refer to:

Frank Nicklin (1895 – 1978), Australian politician
Jeff Nicklin (c. 1915 – 1945), Canadian soldier and football player
Percy Nicklin (fl. 1930s), British ice hockey coach
Electoral district of Nicklin in Australia

See also
Nicklin Ministry led by Frank Nicklin
Nicklin Way, street in Queensland, Australia